Carl Bonafede was born in the Little Italy Chicago community on October 16, 1940. He appeared as a young boy on local television on Morris B. Sach's Amateur Hour singing and playing the accordion. He appeared on an interview show, Ernie Simon's Curbstone Cut-up. He sang his hit record "Were Wolf" on disc-jockey Jim Lounsbury's TV show in Chicago. He went on to promote local bands with his weekly dances at local ballrooms including the Aragon Ballroom, Madura's Danceland and The Holiday Ballroom with owner and collaborator Dan Belloc of big band fame (Billy May Orchestra). He recorded and produced over 200 records with various recording artists. He fronted a local group, The Gem-tones, whose saxophone player, Harry Manfredini, became a movie musical score arranger for the "Friday the 13th" movies. He then turned to managing and promoting local teen bands (garage-bands in the early 60s). His most famous clients were The Buckinghams and the all-girl group The Daughters of Eve. He also managed Thee Prophets, from Wisconsin and Mickey & Larry and the Exciters from Boston. He managed The Delights, in Chicago. He worked for the Willard Alexander Booking Agency with agent Herb Gronauer, who now promotes celebrities in Palm Springs, California. He also worked for the CASK Attractions agency.

As a young band manager Bonafede promoted many young teens in a new phenomenon – the garage band. One of these groups included The Fabulous Centuries. The Centuries consisted of Nick Fortuna, Curtis Bachman, Carl Giammarese and Jerry Elarde. Carl Bonafede first crossed paths with Phil Orsi in 1964 when Phil was fronting Phil Orsi and the Little Kings at the Vogue Ballroom in Chicago. Another group with great vocal harmonies was known as The Pulsations. John Poulos, Dennis Miccolis, George LeGros and Dennis Tufano were members of The Pulsations. These two groups merged to form The Buckinghams. One day, Sheldon Cooper, an executive at WGN-TV, witnessed a promotion of Carl's outside Lane Tech High School across the street from WGN-TV's studios. Carl's discussion with Cooper led to The Pulsations entering and winning a competition to appear for 13 weeks on The All-Time Hits, Chicago's first locally produced TV program broadcast in color, featuring a variety of musical guests. By the end of the 13-week run, the Pulsations/Fabulous Centuries became The Buckinghams. He was on hand at the Chess Records studios in Chicago, Illinois to record "Kind of a Drag" with the Buckinghams co-producer 'Dan Belloc and arranger Frank Tesinsky. Jim Holvay of the local Chicago group The Mob was the composer of "Kind of a Drag".

Present day
As of 2017, Carl Bonafede aka "The Screaming Wildman" (a nickname given to him by a priest who witnessed Carl running a local parish teenage dance) still lives and works in Chicago in the Lincoln Park area, close to the lakefront.

Discography

The Daughters of Eve

USA 1779, 1966.
 "Hey Lover"
 Originally a modest hit for Debbie Dovale in 1963.
 "Stand by Me"
 Produced by Carl Bonafede and Ron Malo.

USA 891, 1967.
 "Symphony of My Soul"
 Penned by Chicago songwriter James Butler (with a little help from Tchaikovsky).
 "Help Me Boy"
 As "Help Me Girl", a hit for Eric Burdon and The Animals earlier in 1967.
 Produced by Carl Bonafede and James Butler.

Spectra Sound 920, 1967.
 "Don't Waste My Time"
 Written by John Serafini.
 "He Cried"
 As popularised by The Shangri-Las, and previously a hit, as "She Cried", for Jay and the Americans in 1962.
 Produced by Carl Bonafede, engineered by Ron Malo.

Cadet 5600, 1968.
 "Social Tragedy"
 Written by James Butler, and subsequently recorded, as "Don't Let It Slip Away", by Ral Donner.
 "A Thousand Stars"
 Introduced by The Rivileers in 1954, but popularised by Kathy Young and The Innocents in 1960.
 Produced by Carl Bonafede, engineered by Gary Knipper and Ed Cody.

References

External links
 The Buckinghams official web site
 The story of The Daughters of Eve by Debi Pomeroy and Mick Patrick
 The Screaming Wildman Blogspot 
 Carl Bonafede Blogspot
 Carl Bonafede Official Web site
 Discogs.com

American music managers
Record producers from Illinois
People from Chicago
Living people
1940 births